Kharv-e Sofla (also Romanized as Kharv-e Soflá; also known as Kharv-e Pā’īn) is a village in Golshan Rural District, in the Central District of Tabas County, South Khorasan Province, Iran. At the 2006 census, its population was 20, in 7 families.

References 

Populated places in Tabas County